James Thomas Darnell (born January 19, 1987) is a professional baseball player who is retired. He was drafted in the second round of the 2008 Major League Baseball draft and played for the San Diego Padres from 2008 through 2013.

High school

Darnell attended Upland High School, Arrowhead Christian Academy and San Ramon Valley High School. He was a four-year varsity starter and a four-year All-League high school selection. He compiled a career batting average of .475 with 20 home runs and 50 stolen bases.

College

In 2007, Darnell led the South Carolina Gamecocks Baseball team with a .331 average. He collected 19 home runs and 63 RBIs. James earned second team All-Southeastern Conference honors at third base. In 2006 and 2007, Darnell played collegiate summer baseball for the Hyannis Mets of the Cape Cod Baseball League. In 2007, he was a Cape Cod Baseball League All-Star. In 2008, James hit .306 with 19 homers and 81 RBIs and again selected to All-Southeastern Conference honors at third base. At the University of South Carolina Darnell was accepted into number one international business school at the Darla Moore School of Business. He was also an SEC Academic Honor Roll Member.

Training

James has learned from and trained extensively with the following:
Erik Johnson (infielder) - SF Giants
Tony Gwynn- SD Padres
Aaron Thigpen- USA Olympic Sprinter
Russ Buller- USA Olympic Pole Vaulter
Athletes Performance- Phoenix, AZ
Alan Jaeger- Jaeger Sports
Greg King- Cape Cod Baseball League
Dustin Hughes- Cincinnati Reds
Dave Dunlap- Master Trainer
Hunter Stark- Andrews Institute

Professional career
Darnell was selected in the 2nd Round (69th Overall) of the 2008 draft by the San Diego Padres. He was rated by Baseball America as the Best Athlete within the San Diego Padres organization. In 2009, James was a Baseball America Top 100 Prospect. Following the 2009 season, Darnell was ranked the San Diego Padres number 3 prospect.

He hit .329 with 17 doubles, seven home runs and 38 RBIs in 66 games with the TinCaps. He was selected as Mid-Season Mid-West League All-Star before his promotion to the Class-A Advanced Lake Elsinore Storm of the California League. With the Storm he hit .294 with 18 doubles, 13 home runs and 43 RBIs in 60 games giving him a combined total of a .311 average with 35 doubles, four triples, 20 home runs, 81 RBIs, eight stolen bases and 87 walks. At season's end he was named as the Padres' Organizational Player of the Year by MLB.com.

Darnell played for the Class AA San Antonio Missions during the 2011 season. James hit .333 with 17 home runs, 62 RBIs, .434 OBP, .604 SLG in only 76 games. He was selected as Texas League Player of the Week, Mid-Season All-Star, MVP of the Texas League All-Star Game, Baseball America AA All-Star, and selected to participate in the 2011 XM Futures Game at Chase Field.

During Darnell's Minor League career, he played in 407 games, compiled a .297 average, hit 63 home runs, drove in 264 runs, .394 OBP, and .502 SLG.

Darnell made his major league debut at Citi Field in New York on August 8, 2011. James played in 25 MLB games, homering off of Wade Miley and Stephen Strasburg. James' career was cut short by three shoulder operations.

Tampa Bay Rays
Darnell signed a minor league deal with the Tampa Bay Rays on January 6, 2014. He became a free agent after the 2014 season.

References

External links

Living people
1987 births
Sportspeople from California
San Diego Padres players
South Carolina Gamecocks baseball players
Hyannis Harbor Hawks players
Eugene Emeralds players
Fort Wayne Wizards players
Lake Elsinore Storm players
San Antonio Missions players
Tucson Padres players